This is a list of all stations on the Mass Rapid Transit (MRT) system in Singapore. As of 2022, the Singapore MRT has  of system length spread across six lines, the 19th highest in the world.

The locations of the stations are based on planning areas established by the Urban Redevelopment Authority for urban planning purpose; if a station is situated along the boundary of two or more planning areas (e.g., Farrer Park station), more than one location will be shown. This takes into account the entire area of the station, both underground and above-ground sections, and not simply its above-ground features like exits (e.g., the underground segment of Mountbatten station stretches across Geylang and Kallang planning areas, hence it will be stated as such in the list below, even when both its above-ground exits are located wholly within Geylang planning area).

Abbreviation for MRT stations are listed as transaction histories viewed via General Ticketing Machines display trip details using abbreviated station names. All names listed under the "station name" column are officially confirmed names.

Station naming
Ever since the construction of the Circle Line, the Land Transport Authority (LTA) has conducted various public consultation exercises with Singaporeans across the internet and survey forms as to what new station names should be.

MRT stations 
Legend

See also
List of Singapore LRT stations

Notes

References

External links
Train System Map
Singapore MRT Travel Guide

Mass Rapid Transit (Singapore) stations
Singapore MRT
MRT Stations